Bruno Latour proposes the idea of an Oligopticon as a site for the manufacture of social structures (such as scientific knowledge, or our system of law). He contrasts the oligopticon with Michel Foucault's account of the surveillance mechanism that is the Panopticon. Whereas the ideal of the panopticon is a kind of total surveillance that feeds both (guards') megalomania and (prisoners') paranoia, oligoptica are sites that, "do exactly the opposite of panoptica: they see much too little to feed the megalomania of the inspector or the paranoia of the inspected, but what they see, they see it well."

The account of the oligopticon is introduced in order to further Latour's account of the proceedings of scientific activity. Oligoptica are sites for the production of consensus and knowledge, and also for the manufacture of structural effects like "culture" and "gender". Latour makes further contrasts between oligoptica and panoramas, "panoramas, as etymology suggests, see everything. But they also see nothing since they simply show an image painted (or projected) on the tiny wall of a room fully closed to the outside." What Latour means by this is that the panorama conveys a master narrative or 'big picture', with the illusion of coherence, whereas structures that can be traced to oligoptica have many different connections - these are individually fragile but powerful as a whole.

Latour describes parliaments, courtrooms and offices as examples of oligoptica, or special places where the micro-structures of macro-phenomena are crafted. At such locations, the "panorama of associations" is created, and local activities become a “bigger” issue. Sites such as parliaments or courtrooms satisfy our global need to specify places, where different strands of "macro-social" phenomena are weaved.

"From oligoptica, sturdy but extremely narrow views of the (connected) whole are made possible, as long as connections hold. Nothing it seems can threaten the absolutist gaze of panoptica, and this is why they are loved so much by those sociologists who dream to occupy the center of Bentham’s prison; the tiniest bug can blind oligoptica."

References

Anthropology
Sociological terminology
Bruno Latour